Charles Edward Beckwith (12 May 1901 – 23 March 1970) was a British athlete. He competed in the men's shot put at the 1924 Summer Olympics.

References

External links
 

1901 births
1970 deaths
People from South Molton
Athletes (track and field) at the 1924 Summer Olympics
British male shot putters
Olympic athletes of Great Britain